John A. Businger (born February 5, 1945) is an American politician who served in the Massachusetts House of Representatives from 1971 to 1999.

Since leaving the legislature, Businger has continued to advocate for causes that had animated him in office, including infrastructure projects such as the North-South Rail Link.

In 2010, Common Cause Massachusetts gave Businger their Legislative Achievement Award. Common Cause Massachusetts is a non-partisan advocacy group dedicated to governmental transparency,

See also
 1971–1972 Massachusetts legislature
 1973–1974 Massachusetts legislature
 1975–1976 Massachusetts legislature
 1977–1978 Massachusetts legislature
 1979–1980 Massachusetts legislature
 1981–1982 Massachusetts legislature
 1983–1984 Massachusetts legislature
 1985–1986 Massachusetts legislature
 1987–1988 Massachusetts legislature
 1989–1990 Massachusetts legislature
 1991–1992 Massachusetts legislature
 1993–1994 Massachusetts legislature
 1995–1996 Massachusetts legislature
 1997–1998 Massachusetts legislature

References

External links
 

1945 births
Boston College alumni
Living people
Democratic Party members of the Massachusetts House of Representatives
Politicians from Brookline, Massachusetts
20th-century American politicians
Politicians from Cleveland